San Giusto is a Romanesque-style, Roman Catholic church located in the frazione of San Maroto outside the town of Pievebovigliana, province of Macerata, region of Marche, Italy.

History
The stone church was built between the 11th and 13th centuries. It has a circular layout with a low tiled dome showing the influence of Byzantine style. Semicircular chapels help buttress the dome. The bell tower retains 14th century-frescoes, while the church has an altarpiece depicting the Madonna del Rosario by Venanzio da Camerino. Another altarpiece depicting an Enthroned Madonna and Child dates to the mid 13th-century. The mid-16th century crucifix is attributed to Tobia da Camerino.

References

Romanesque architecture in le Marche
11th-century Roman Catholic church buildings in Italy
Pievebovigliana
Roman Catholic churches in the Marche